Trzciniec  is a village in the administrative district of Gmina Lubartów, within Lubartów County, Lublin Voivodeship, in eastern Poland.

References

Villages in Lubartów County